Madrasa El Tawfikia, also known as the madrasa of Al Haoua Mosque is one of the madrasahs of the medina of Tunis.

Localization 

It is located in Maâkal Az-Zaïm or the leader's place near Al Haoua Mosque.

History
The mosque was built during the Hafsid era in 1253 by the princess Atf, the second wife of the Hafsid sultan Abu Zakariya Yahya and mother of the sultan Muhammad I al-Mustansir.
It taught both Almohad and then Malikite doctrine.
It accommodated Al-Zaytuna University students for centuries.
The madrasa El Tawfikia had an important political role. In fact, in 1928, it hosted Al Zaytuna university students meetings to prepare the first long strike that started in December of the same year and finished in 20 January 1929.

In 1995, the madrasa became the superior institute of Islamic civilization of Tunis.

Teachers
The professor of Ibn Khaldoun Muhammad ibn Abdessalem ibn Yousef El-Hawari taught in this madrasa.

References 

	

El Tawfikia